The R201 road is a regional road in Ireland linking Drumsna in County Leitrim to Belturbet in County Cavan.

En route it passes through several small villages as well as Mohill and Killeshandra.

See also
Roads in Ireland
National primary road
National secondary road

References

Regional roads in the Republic of Ireland
Roads in County Leitrim
Roads in County Cavan